Katia Ledoux (born 18 July 1990) is a French mezzo-soprano of Guadeloupean origin.

Life 
Born in Paris, Ledoux grew up in Vienna, Austria, and took violin lessons before beginning to sing at the age of six, joining the Schubert Sängerknaben. At the age of sixteen, she entered the preparatory class of the University of Music and Performing Arts Vienna, then left Vienna in 2016 to study with Ulf Bästlein at the University of the Arts in the city of Graz where she made her debut at the  contemporary music festival as well as the University of Music and Performing Arts Vienna Graz Opera.
In 2019, she made her debut at the Dutch National Opera in Amsterdam as Genevieve in Pelléas et Mélisande directed by Olivier Py with the Royal Concertgebouw Orchestra conducted by Stéphane Denève.
For the 2019/20 season, as well as 2020/21, she joins the International Opera Studio of the Zürich Opera House where she performs numerous roles.

Awards 
 First prize in the Austrian competition  In 2008
 Finalist of the "Ferruccio Tagliavini" competition in 2017
 Recipient of the "Bourse of the Bayreuth Festival" in 2018;
 Press Award of the International Vocal Competition 's-Hertogenbosch, Netherlands, 2018.
 First prize of the "Nordfriesischer Liedpreis" competition.
 Oratorio-Lied Prize of the "Francisco Viñas International Singing Competition" in Barcelona in 2022

References

External links 
 
  Katia Ledoux on operabase.com
 Katia Ledoux on the official website of the Graz Opera
 Portrait of Katia Ledoux by agence TACT

French operatic mezzo-sopranos
1990 births
Living people
Singers from Paris